Anwar Usman (born 31 December 1956) is an Indonesian judge and jurist, who is currently serving as the sixth Chief Justice of the Constitutional Court of Indonesia. He was elected to the position on 2 April 2018, replacing Arief Hidayat. He previously served as the fifth Deputy Chief Justice of the Constitutional Court of Indonesia. Usman served on the Constitutional Court for four years prior to his confirmation as Deputy Chief Justice. Before replacing Arsyad Sanusi as a sitting justice on the court in April 2011, Usman was a high court judge in Jakarta as well as the manager of human resources at the Supreme Court of Indonesia.

Early life, family, and education

Early life and family 
Anwar Usman was born on 31 December 1956. His father was named Usman A. Rahim, while his mother was named Ramlah. He grew up in his home village of Rasabou, Bima, West Nusa Tenggara. He admitted that he used to live independently.

Education 
He attended elementary school in SDN 03 Sila, Bima, before graduating in 1969. Anwar left his village and his parents to continue his education at the State Religious Teacher Education School (PGAN), for 6 years, until 1975. During the years of living apart from his parents, he learned to be disciplined and independent.

After graduating from PGAN in 1975, he migrated to Jakarta and immediately became honorary teacher at  SD Kalibarul an elementary school. During his time as a teacher, he continued his education. Unlike his PGAN friends who, after graduating, chose to enter either the IAIN (State Islamic Institute) or the IKIP (Institute of Teacher Training and Education), he entered the Faculty of Law, of the Jakarta Islamic University. He graduated in 1984.

Acting career 
During his time as a student, he was active in theater activities under the tutelage of Ismail Soebarjo. He was invited to act in a film starring Nungki Kusumastuti, Frans Tumbuan and Rini S. Bono which was made by his mentor Ismail Soebardjo in 1980, though he only had a minor role in the film. The film was entitled "Perempuan di Pasungan," and it won a number of awards. However, Anwar's involvement in the film, drew criticism from his parents. When the film exploded in popularity, it arrived at Bima. Incidentally, in the film there was a scene where he walked with a woman in Cikini Market, the people in his village were all excited. In fact, in the film he was just a cheerleader. When his father found out, he was scolded.

Judicial career 
After earning a law degree in 1984, Anwar was appointed Judge at the Bogor District Court in 1985.

Supreme Court 
At the Supreme Court, he occupied the position of Assistant to the Supreme Court Justices from 1997 until 2003 which then continued with his appointment as Head of the Supreme Court Personnel Bureau from 2003 until 2006. Then in 2005, he was appointed as Judge of the Jakarta High Court while still employed as Head of the Bureau of Personnel. He also knew Constitutional Justice Hamdan Zoelva, both of whom are from Bima, West Nusa Tenggara.

Constitutional Court 
Since the Constitutional Court was established he has always followed the development of the institution led by Mahfud MD, It was not difficult for him to adapt to the environment in the Constitutional Court. “I immediately adapted. Moreover, the Chairman immediately invited me to join the meeting shortly after I took the oath in front of the President. I heard from friends at the Registrar's Office that the trial in the Constitutional Court sometimes lasted until midnight. Of course I'm ready for that," Anwar said.

As a judge, he carried out his duties by following the example of Muhammad. He cites the story of Muhammad. "It is narrated in a hadith, the Prophet Muhammad was once visited by the leaders of the Quraysh to ask for special treatment for the children of the Quraysh nobles who stole. He wisely said, 'By Allah, if my own daughter Fatimah steals, I will cut off her hand'. This means that law enforcement and justice must be applied to everyone without exception," he explained.

Anwar Usman was among the minority judges who ruled in favor of outlawing premarital sex and criminalizing consensual same-sex conducts in the Court's decision in 2017.

Personal life 
He was married to Suhada, until her death in February 2021. Together, they have three children.

References

1956 births
21st-century Indonesian judges
Justices of the Constitutional Court of Indonesia
Living people
People from Bima Regency
20th-century Indonesian judges